Dannyu Francisco dos Santos (born 28 October 1984), commonly known as Dão, is a Brazilian football defender who currently plays for Barra Futebol Clube.

Career
Dão began his professional career with Recife, before making moves to CRB and Mirassol. In 2009, he joined Guarani where he made 22 appearances before leaving Brazil for the first time to join Slovakian club Spartak Trnava in summer 2010. He returned to his homeland a year later, without playing for Trnava, to sign for Botafogo. He failed to register an appearance for Botafogo before signing for Red Bull Brasil, he again didn't make an appearance.

2012 saw a move to Luverdense where he stayed for one season, during his time in Lucas do Rio Verde he played 16 times and scored twice. After a relatively successful period with Luverdense, Dão was on the move again as he joined Chapecoense, he played in 22 Chapecoense matches and scored one goal. Between 2014 and 2015, Dão completed transfers firstly to Vitória and secondly to Paysandu, overall he made nine appearances for the two aforementioned clubs before signing for Piracicaba at the beginning of 2016. His spell with Piracicaba was short as he left on 12 April.

Honours
Recife
Campeonato Pernambucano (2): 2006, 2007

Luverdense
Campeonato Mato-Grossense (1): 2012

References

External links
 
 Dão at ZeroZero

1984 births
Living people
Brazilian footballers
Expatriate footballers in Slovakia
Brazilian expatriate sportspeople in Slovakia
Campeonato Brasileiro Série A players
Campeonato Brasileiro Série B players
Campeonato Brasileiro Série C players
Campeonato Brasileiro Série D players
Sport Club do Recife players
Clube de Regatas Brasil players
Mirassol Futebol Clube players
Guarani FC players
FC Spartak Trnava players
Botafogo Futebol Clube (SP) players
Red Bull Brasil players
Luverdense Esporte Clube players
Associação Chapecoense de Futebol players
Esporte Clube Vitória players
Paysandu Sport Club players
Esporte Clube XV de Novembro (Piracicaba) players
River Atlético Clube players
Esporte Clube Cruzeiro players
América Futebol Clube (RN) players
União Recreativa dos Trabalhadores players
Esporte Clube Noroeste players
Esporte Clube Pelotas players
Association football defenders